Curtis Levi Haynes-Brown (born 15 April 1989) is an English footballer who plays as a centre-back for Felixstowe & Walton United F.C.

Haynes-Brown began his career at Colchester United progressing through their youth system before being released in the summer of 2008, without making a senior appearance. He dropped into non-league football for three seasons with AFC Sudbury and Lowestoft Town before signing for Yeovil Town.

Career
Haynes-Brown was born in Ipswich, Suffolk. He started his career at Colchester United spending seven years in the youth and reserve sides, during this time having a three-week trial for Ipswich Town, before being released in May 2008. He then signed for Isthmian League Division One North side AFC Sudbury, where he spent two seasons making over fifty appearances for the Suffolk side. Haynes-Brown then moved to Isthmian League Premier Division side Lowestoft Town signing a two-year contract and made 17 appearances helping them to the brink of promotion to the Conference South losing the Isthmian Premier League play-off final against Tonbridge Angels.

In July 2011, Haynes-Brown went on trial with Football League Two side Crewe Alexandra but failed to earn a contract. Following this, Haynes-Brown then went on trial with Football League One side Yeovil Town, this move angered Lowestoft's joint-manager Ady Gallagher who claimed Yeovil showed his club a lack of respect. Despite this Haynes-Brown signed a two-year contract with Yeovil, who paid Lowestoft a fee for his services. On 6 August 2011, Haynes-Brown made his debut in the 56th minute by coming on a substitute for Max Ehmer in a 2–0 defeat against Brentford. On 23 August 2012, Haynes-Brown joined League Two side AFC Wimbledon on loan for a month. On 25 August 2012, Haynes-Brown made his AFC Wimbledon debut in a 5–1 defeat against Bradford City and had the ignominy of scoring an own goal. After being injured in his first game for Wimbledon, Haynes-Brown appeared six times for Wimbledon in total before he returned to Yeovil at the completion of his two-month loan deal. On 22 November, after only appearing once for Yeovil since his return from Wimbledon, Haynes-Brown joined Conference National side Cambridge United on loan until January 2013.

On 4 January 2013, Haynes-Brown signed for Cambridge United on a free transfer from Yeovil Town signing a deal until the end of the season. Haynes-Brown made 14 further appearances for Cambridge before being released at the end of the season.

In July 2013, Haynes-Brown returned to Lowestoft Town on a two-year contract.

In July 2015, Haynes-Brown signed a one-year contract with Macclesfield Town. However, in a friendly game against Congleton Town, Haynes-Brown ruptured his Achilles tendon and missed most of the season. In February 2016 he signed for Maldon & Tiptree in the Isthmian League Division One North and went on to make 12 appearances in the 2015–16 season. It was confirmed in June 2016 that Haynes-Brown had re-signed for Maldon & Tiptree for the 2016–17 season.

Curtis signed for Isthmian North league Felixstowe and Walton United FC in June 2020 to join former Leiston manager Stuart Boardley.

References

External links

1989 births
Living people
Sportspeople from Ipswich
English footballers
Association football defenders
Colchester United F.C. players
A.F.C. Sudbury players
Lowestoft Town F.C. players
Yeovil Town F.C. players
AFC Wimbledon players
Cambridge United F.C. players
Macclesfield Town F.C. players
Maldon & Tiptree F.C. players
Leiston F.C. players
English Football League players
National League (English football) players